Skye Green is a hamlet at the north the civil parish of Feering, and in the Braintree district of Essex, England. The hamlet is situated between the village of Feering,  to the south, and the Coggeshall hamlet of Surrex,  to the north. Nearby settlements include Langley Green, Broad Green and Stocks Green.

Skye Green includes Home Farm, Cockerell's Farm and Shoulder Hall. The hamlet contains two Grade II listed buildings: Cockerell's Farmhouse (c.1700) with Bakehouse (c.1800), and The Old Cottage which dates to the 17th century.

References

Hamlets in Essex
Braintree District